The history of the Jews in Zimbabwe reaches back over one century. Present-day Zimbabwe was formerly known as Southern Rhodesia and later as Rhodesia.

History
During the 19th century, Ashkenazi Jews from Russia and Lithuania settled in Rhodesia after the area had been colonized by the British, and became active in the trading industry. In 1894, the first synagogue was established in a tent in Bulawayo. The second community developed in Salisbury (later renamed Harare) in 1895. A third congregation was established in Gwelo in 1901. By 1900, approximately 300 Jews lived in Rhodesia.

In the 1930s a number of Sephardic Jews arrived in Rhodesia from the Greek island of Rhodes and mainly settled in Salisbury. This was followed by another wave in the 1960s when Jews fled the Belgian Congo . A Sephardic Jewish Community Synagogue was established in Salisbury in the 1950s.

In the late 1930s, German Jews fleeing Nazi persecution settled in the colony. In 1943, the Rhodesian Zionist Council and the Rhodesian Jewish Board of Deputies were established, later being renamed the Central African Zionist Council and Central African Board of Jewish Deputies in 1946.
 
In the first half of the 20th century there was a high level of assimilation by Rhodesian Jews into Rhodesian society, and intermarriage rates were high. Roy Welensky, the second and last Prime Minister of the Federation of Rhodesia and Nyasaland, was the son of a Lithuanian Jewish father and an Afrikaner mother. By 1957, one out of every seven Jews who married in Rhodesia married a Gentile.

In addition to the Rhodesian Zionist Council and the Rhodesian Jewish Board of Deputies the Jewish Community developed institutions to serve and strengthen the community including two Jewish Day Schools (one in Harare called Sharon School and one in Bulawayo called Carmel School), community centers, Jewish Cemeteries, Zionist youth movements, Jewish owned sports clubs, Savyon Old Age Home in Bulawayo and several women's organisations. A number of Jews from Zionist youth movements emigrated to Israel.

In 1992, President Robert Mugabe caused upset to the Jewish community in Zimbabwe when he remarked that "[white] commercial farmers are hard-hearted people, you would think they were Jews".

In 2003 the Bulawayo Synagogue burned down and the small community did not restore the building. Prayers are generally held at the Sinai Hall or Savyon Lodge in Bulawayo. In Harare the Sephardic Community has its own synagogue, and the Ashkenazi Community has a separate synagogue. Today because of small numbers of congregants the prayers alternate between the two synagogues.

Today, about 120 Jews live in Zimbabwe, chiefly in Harare and Bulawayo. There are no Jews remaining in Kwekwe, Gweru, and Kadoma. Two-thirds of Zimbabwean Jews are over 65 years of age. The last bar mitzvah took place in 2006.

Lemba people

The Lemba people speak the Bantu languages spoken by their geographic neighbours and resemble them physically, but they have some religious practices and beliefs similar to those in Judaism and Islam, which they claim were transmitted by oral tradition. They have a tradition of ancient Jewish or South Arabian descent through their male line. Genetic Y-DNA analyses in the 2000s have established a partially Middle-Eastern origin for a portion of the male Lemba population. More recent research argues that DNA studies do not support claims for a specifically Jewish genetic heritage.

See also

 History of the Jews in Malawi
 History of the Jews in Mozambique
 History of the Jews in South Africa
 History of the Jews in Southern Africa
 History of the Jews in Zambia
 Israel–Zimbabwe relations

References

External links
 Official website of the Zimbabwe Jewish Community